Goght (formerly Goghot) is a village in the Kotayk Province of Armenia, located on the right bank of the upper-Azat River. It is known from 13th-century manuscripts as Goghot. It is located near Garni and sits along the road leading to Geghard Monastery. The village has a small ruined basilica from the 17th or 18th century located straight down a dirt road from the main square. Some khachkars are built into the exterior walls of the church, as well as at its altar. Goght sits overlooking a large gorge and upon a promontory on the other side is the 11th- to 13th-century monastery of Havuts Tar. It may be reached by foot from the town, but more easily from Garni via the Garni Gorge. The community has a school, kindergarten, house of culture, and a library. The local economy is heavily dependent on agriculture, based primarily on grain farming, orchard cultivation, and cattle-breeding.

Gallery

See also 
Kotayk Province

References 

World Gazeteer: Armenia – World-Gazetteer.com

External links 

Populated places in Kotayk Province
Tourist attractions in Kotayk Province